Miljan Pecelj (Serbian Cyrillic: Миљан Пецељ, born 13 April 1979) is a Serbian retired football player.

Club career
Born in Mostar, SR Bosnia and Herzegovina, his football career started in the youth squad of his home town club FK Velež Mostar. Next, he moved to Belgrade, in Serbia to play in the youth squad of the 1992 European and World Champions Red Star Belgrade. In 1995, he moved to Slovakia to be one of the first foreigners in Lokomotíva Košice, where he stayed two seasons. Then, he moved to Austrian Bundesliga club FK Austria Vienna, but next summer he moved to Turkey to play in the great Galatasaray SK. After only half a season, in January 1999, he was back to Serbia, this time, to play in Radnički Niš, and next in Hajduk Kula. In summer 2001, he moved to Cyprus club AEL Limassol, where he stayed one season. Since 2002, he was back to Bosnia to play in a number of clubs: NK Brotnjo, his home town HŠK Zrinjski, FK Leotar from Trebinje (twice), and Sloboda Tuzla, his last club. In between, he had a spell in Croatia in Prva HNL club Inter Zaprešić, in the season 2005-06.
Sometimes, he is named in some internet websites as Miljan instead of Milan.

Personal life
His brother Srđan is also a footballer.

Honours
 Galatasaray
1 time Turkish Super League Champion: 1998-99
1 time Turkish Cup winner: 1999

References

External links
 Prva HNL stats in 1hnl.net

1979 births
Living people
Sportspeople from Mostar
Association football forwards
Bosnia and Herzegovina footballers
FC Lokomotíva Košice players
FK Austria Wien players
Galatasaray S.K. footballers
FK Radnički Niš players
FK Hajduk Kula players
AEL Limassol players
NK Brotnjo players
HŠK Zrinjski Mostar players
FK Leotar players
NK Inter Zaprešić players
FK Sloboda Tuzla players
Slovak Super Liga players
First League of Serbia and Montenegro players
Premier League of Bosnia and Herzegovina players
Croatian Football League players
Bosnia and Herzegovina expatriate footballers
Expatriate footballers in Slovakia
Bosnia and Herzegovina expatriate sportspeople in Slovakia
Expatriate footballers in Austria
Bosnia and Herzegovina expatriate sportspeople in Austria
Expatriate footballers in Turkey
Bosnia and Herzegovina expatriate sportspeople in Turkey
Expatriate footballers in Serbia and Montenegro
Bosnia and Herzegovina expatriate sportspeople in Serbia and Montenegro
Expatriate footballers in Cyprus
Bosnia and Herzegovina expatriate sportspeople in Cyprus
Expatriate footballers in Croatia
Bosnia and Herzegovina expatriate sportspeople in Croatia